Conilithes brezinae is an extinct species of sea snail, a marine gastropod mollusk, in the family Conidae, the cone snails and their allies.

Distribution
This species occurs in the following locations:
 Bosnia and Herzegovina
 Czech Republic
 Hungary
 Poland
 Romania
 Slovakia
 Slovenia
 Turkey

References

Conidae